Eestlane olen ja eestlaseks jään (Estonian: "I am Estonian and I will remain Estonian") is a protest song from the Estonian Singing Revolution performed by Ivo Linna and the group In Spe with lyrics by Alo Mattiisen.

Written despite the official attitude of the Soviet Union that all its citizens were Soviets, rather than the individual nationalities, the lyric makes the singer's contrary position very clear. Loosely translated from Estonian into English, Linna sings "I am an Estonian and I will remain an Estonian/when I was created as an Estonian/Being Estonian is proud and free like a crow/Yes, just like that, freely like a crow".

The song is often performed at the Estonian Laulupidu and other patriotic events, as well as being regarded as one of Estonia's favourite songs.

Lyrics

References

External Links 

 

Year of song missing
Estonian patriotic songs
Estonian songs